Osvaldo Sala is an ecologist known for his research on how climate change affects biodiversity and arid ecosystems.

Early life and education 
After completing an undergraduate program at The University of Buenos Aires, Sala continued his education at Colorado State University in Fort Colins, Co., where he earned both his MS and Ph.D. in Ecology.

Career and research 

Sala currently works at Arizona State University where he serves as the director of the Global Drylands Center, which he founded. At ASU, he also holds the positions of Regents Professor, Foundation Professor, and Julie A. Wrigley Chair. Formerly, he taught as a Professor of Biology at his Alma Mater, The University of Buenos Aires in Argentina.He also worked at Brown University where he founded and directed the Environmental Change Initiative and taught as a Lindemann Professor of Biology (a distinguished position/title).

Awards and honors 
Sala was selected as a fellow for The Ecological Society of America in 2013 before being elected their president in 2019. He is also a Fellow of the American Geophysical Union, Fellow of the American Association for the Advancement of Science, and Elected Member of the American Academy of Arts and Sciences and National Academy of Exact, Physical and Natural Sciences (Academia Nacional de Ciencias Exactas, Físicas y Naturales) of Argentina.

References 

Year of birth missing (living people)
Living people
Argentine ecologists
University of Buenos Aires alumni
Colorado State University alumni
Arizona State University faculty
Fellows of the American Geophysical Union